Fábio Audi (born December 9, 1987) is a Brazilian actor and producer.

Career 
He graduated in theater from the Superior School of Arts Célia Helena, and in cinema by the Armando Álvares Penteado Foundation (FAAP), both from São Paulo. He obtained a projection for his performance as Gabriel in the 2010 short film I Don't Want to Go Back Alone, directed by Daniel Ribeiro, playing the character Gabriel. He returned to represent the same role in the film's feature version The Way He Looks, also of Daniel Ribeiro, released in 2014.

In 2014, he made his television debut in the telenovela Alto Astral by Daniel Ortiz on Rede Globo, playing Heitor.

Filmography

Awards & Nominations

References

External links 

1987 births
Living people
Male actors from São Paulo (state)
Brazilian male film actors
Bisexual male actors
Brazilian bisexual people
Brazilian male television actors
Brazilian LGBT actors
Brazilian film directors
21st-century Brazilian male actors
People from Itapira